Radarmaker were a Perth-based, Australian indie rock band that formed in 2000 and disbanded in 2009. Song-writing duties and instruments were shared equally between the four members. Their name was taken from a track on Mogwai's album Young Team.

As well as producing the band's records, local music producer Trevor Bryan Cotton has performed live with the band on a number of occasions playing both on the drums and bass guitar.

Discography

Play
Radarmaker released their first single Play in 2002 and it received regular airplay on the radio station RTRFM.

"Play"

Aristocracy and the Horse
Aristocracy and the Horse is the name of Radarmaker's debut EP. It was released on 6 May 2005 after 15 months of recording, mixing and producing. A promotional music video for the song "Arm versus Fiery Antenna" was directed by Noah Norton and was nominated for a WAMI and a WASA as well as being played on rage in 2005. The track "Hurstville 1928" received regular airplay on RTRFM and the track "Atlas Shrugged" was played on Triple J's Soundlab. The EP contains the following tracks:

"Atlas Shrugged"
"Arm versus Fiery Antenna"
"Deliquesce"
"Rusalka"
"Hurstville 1928"

Drawn like Spires
Drawn like Spires is the debut album from Radarmaker.  The band started recording the album in July 2005 with the ambition to release before Christmas, however the band later rescheduled the release to 8 July 2006 to accommodate a larger track list. They chose to again work with producer Trevor Bryan Cotton at Shogun Studios and the album was mastered by local producer Neil Rabinowitz of found: quantity of sheep fame. The following tracks are included on the album:

"Balthazaar"
"Shallow Socialites (Battle The Axe)"
"Clodhopper"
"Gary Oldman"
"Matabo Elektrwerkzeuge"
"Squibbon"
"Sashegyi"
"Stop Being A Wanker"
"Domovoi"
"Toaster"
"Whoop Tuffet"
"Ogden's Cormorant"
"Trees of Greenland"

A promotional video for "Stop Being a Wanker" was released and broadcast on rage, it was directed by Noah Norton and edited by Wendi Graham.

Future
Having spent the first half of 2007 making rare performances as a three-piece, Radarmaker intend to start gigging and writing new material in August upon Adam Trainer's return from Europe. In an interview with base.ad the band expressed desires to tour the east coast of Australia and Spain, where they have found success. In the same interview the band speculate that their next studio venture may take place in Japan.

Despite these ambitions the band ceased performing and recording in 2009. Noah Norton and Wendi Graham have continued to perform as a duet under the moniker Balthazar and Adam Trainer has made a transition towards more noise orientated solo projects.

Influences 
Radarmaker take their name from the Mogwai song 'Radar Maker', although the band's influence on their sound has diminished over recent years. Major influences include Sonic Youth, Yo La Tengo and Do Make Say Think. "Atlas Shrugged" is said to have been named after the popular book by Ayn Rand, however, Wendi Graham has since stated that she hates the book.

Members
Warwick Hall (Guitar, glockenspiel, bass guitar, vocals)
Adam Trainer (Guitar, drums, bass, vocals, glockenspiel, screwdrivers)
Noah Norton (Guitar, drums, bass, vocals)
Wendi Graham (Guitar, drums, bass, vocals, glockenspiel, ebow)

See also
List of post-rock bands

References

External links 
The Official Radarmaker Website
AMO Artist profile - Radarmaker
Triple J Unearthed Artist profile - Radarmaker
An interview with the band that appeared in First Past the Post

Australian post-rock groups
Western Australian musical groups